Edward Halsey Jenison (July 27, 1907 – June 24, 1996) was a U.S. Representative for three terms, Illinois State Representative for one term, and newspaper publisher of the Daily Beacon-News of Paris, Illinois for 65 years.

Born in Fond du Lac, Wisconsin, Jenison attended the public schools and the University of Wisconsin–Madison. He engaged in newspaper work, from 1925 to 1937, and as a publisher, since 1938, of the Paris, Illinois Daily Beacon-News. He served as lieutenant commander in the United States Navy, attached to the Deputy Chief of Naval Operations for Air, with service in the Pacific and Atlantic Forces, from April 1943 to September 1946.

Jenison was elected as a Republican to the Eightieth, Eighty-first, and Eighty-second Congresses (January 3, 1947 – January 3, 1953). He was an unsuccessful candidate for reelection in 1952 to the Eighty-third Congress, in 1954 to the Eighty-fourth Congress, and in 1962 to the Eighty-eighth Congress. He resumed the publishing business, and was named "master editor" by the Southern Illinois Editorial Association in 1986. He served as delegate to the 1956 Republican National Convention and 1968 Republican National Convention. He served as director, Department of Finance, State of Illinois, from June 15, 1960, to January 20, 1961. He served as a member of the Illinois House of Representatives for one term from 1965 to 1966. Jenison also served in the Illinois House of Representatives from November 7, 1973 to the end of his term in 1974. He was appointed to replace William D. Cox who was convicted in the United States District Court for mail fraud and filing a false income tax return. He served as a delegate, Illinois Sixth Constitutional Convention from 1969 to 1970. He died on June 24, 1996; his funeral service was in Paris, Illinois.

References

External links

1907 births
1996 deaths
American newspaper publishers (people)
Republican Party members of the Illinois House of Representatives
People from Paris, Illinois
Politicians from Fond du Lac, Wisconsin
University of Wisconsin–Madison alumni
Editors of Illinois newspapers
Military personnel from Wisconsin
United States Navy officers
Republican Party members of the United States House of Representatives from Illinois
20th-century American politicians
Journalists from Illinois
20th-century American journalists
American male journalists
Military personnel from Illinois